John Gilbert Shaw (January 16, 1859 – July 21, 1932) was a U.S. Representative from North Carolina.

Born near Fayetteville, North Carolina, Shaw attended the common schools.
He engaged in the naval-stores business.
He studied law.
He was admitted to the bar in 1888 and commenced practice in Fayetteville.
He served as member of the State house of representatives in 1888.
He served as prosecuting attorney for Cumberland County 1890–1894.

Shaw was elected as a Democrat to the Fifty-fourth Congress (March 4, 1895 – March 3, 1897).
He was an unsuccessful candidate for reelection in 1896 to the Fifty-fifth Congress.
He resumed the practice of law in Fayetteville, North Carolina, until his death in that city on July 21, 1932.
He was interred in Cross Creek Cemetery.

Sources

1859 births
1932 deaths
Democratic Party members of the North Carolina House of Representatives
Democratic Party members of the United States House of Representatives from North Carolina
Politicians from Fayetteville, North Carolina